Emmanuel is the second studio album by Puerto Rican rapper Anuel AA, released on May 29, 2020. The 22-track double album features collaborations from Travis Barker, Tego Calderón, Bad Bunny, Enrique Iglesias, Farruko, Zion, Lil Wayne, Kendo Kaponi, Yandel, Ñengo Flow, Mariah Angeliq, Karol G, Daddy Yankee, Ozuna and J Balvin.

Background 
On May 27, 2020, Anuel AA announced and revealed the tracklist for Emmanuel. Anuel AA had originally planned to release the album in April, but postponed the date due to the COVID-19 pandemic. Regarding the title of the album, the artist explained, "It's my name and it means 'God with us'. I wanted the album to have that good vibe. It's my life, made into music".

On the day of the album's release, he promoted the album by launching three luxury yachts off the coast of Miami's Isle of Normandy neighborhood. Each yacht had the name Emmanuel written on the side and played his music at high volume. The rapper explained his promotional strategy by saying, "Everybody does their release party in a club. And with coronavirus? I wouldn't go to the club right now!".

Reception 
Suzy Exposito of Rolling Stone called the album "a sonic feast that every bit as show-stopping, however indulgent, as his fleet of party boats...Even in the most crowded of featured tracks, Anuel’s hardy baritone cuts right through, leaving in his wake the smallest glint of pop sparkle". Griselda Flores of Billboard opined that several of the collaboration choices were "surprising" and stated "Emmanuel is a versatile album that has fresh music for the clubs, the street life, and even sentimental bops."

Commercial performance 
Emmanuel debut at number eight on the US Billboard 200 dated June 16, 2020, earning 39,000 equivalent album units earned in the week ending June 4, according to Nielsen Music/MRC Data. Of Emmanuel's starting count, 3,000 were in album sales and the bulk of the remainder attributed to streams. It registered 36,000 SEA units, equating to 55.8 million on-demand streams for the album's songs in its opening week.

Also, the album debut at number one on the US Top Latin Albums and Latin Rhythm Albums, becoming his second album to top both charts. With 39,000 units, Emmanuel net the third biggest debut of 2020 for a Latin album in terms of overall units. Of the 22 tracks 14 debuts on the Hot Latin Songs chart two of them in the top 10. It was the second Best Selling Latin Album in the United States with 411,000 equivalent album units.

The album also debut at the top of the Spanish Albums Chart and at the top 20 in Italy and Switzerland. Emmanuel was Anuel AA first album to debut in the Canadian Album Charts.

Track listing 

Notes
 In the CD version, "Antes y Después" and "Estrés Postraumático" are switched.

Charts

Weekly charts

Year-end charts

Certifications

References 

2020 albums
Anuel AA albums
Spanish-language albums
Sony Music Latin albums
Albums postponed due to the COVID-19 pandemic
Albums produced by Travis Barker
Albums produced by Ovy on the Drums
Albums produced by Tainy